is a Japanese football player. He plays for Tochigi Uva FC.

Club statistics
Updated to 23 February 2018.

References

External links
Profile at Nagano Parceiro
Profile at Tokyo Verdy

1992 births
Living people
Komazawa University alumni
Association football people from Tokyo
Japanese footballers
J2 League players
J3 League players
Tokyo Verdy players
AC Nagano Parceiro players
Tochigi City FC players
Association football defenders